The Seymour River, one of three by that name in the province of British Columbia, Canada, is a river in the Central Coast region, flowing south out of the Pacific Ranges of the Coast Mountains into the head of Seymour Inlet, the largest of a maze of inland waterways within a relatively low area of the British Columbia mainland on the northwest side of the Queen Charlotte Strait region.

See also
List of British Columbia rivers
Seymour River (disambiguation)

References

Rivers of the Central Coast of British Columbia
Rivers of the Pacific Ranges